The National Environment Management Authority (NEMA) is a Kenyan government agency responsible for the management of the environment, and environmental policy. NEMA is located in Nairobi.

History
The Agency was formed on 1 July 2002 following the merger of three government departments: the National Environment Secretariat (NES), the Permanent Presidential Commission on Soil Conservation and Afforestation (PPCSCA), and the Department of Resource Surveys and Remote Sensing (DRSRS).

See also 
 Environmental management
 Permanent Presidential Commission on Soil Conservation and Afforestation (PPCSCA)
 Ratemo Michieka, a former NEMA director

References

External links 
 National Environment Management Authority

Environmental organisations based in Kenya
Environment
Organisations based in Nairobi